Pintic may refer to several places in Romania:

 Pintic, a village in the town of Dej, Cluj County
 Pintic, a village in Tulgheș Commune, Harghita County
 Pinticu, a village in Teaca Commune, Bistrița-Năsăud County
 Slătiniţa, formerly Pintic, a village in Bistrița city, Bistrița-Năsăud County
 Pintic (river), a river in Bistrița-Năsăud County, tributary of the Dipșa
 Pintic, a river in Harghita and Neamț Counties, tributary of the Bistricioara